Poko may refer to:

Poko, Democratic Republic of the Congo, a town
Poko people of Transvaal, South Africa
Poko (TV series), a Canadian children's television series
Poko Mountain, a mountain in Alaska
Poko Rekords, a Finnish former record label from Tampere, Finland
Poko noctuid moth, an extinct moth in the family Noctuidae
André Biyogo Poko (born 1993), Gabonese footballer

See also
Pom Poko, a 1994 Japanese animated comedy-drama fantasy film directed
Uo Poko, arcade puzzle game developed by Cave and distributed by Jaleco
Woody Poco, a 1987 Japan-exclusive video game
Pocko, an independent press and a creative agency headquartered in London
Pokou (disambiguation)